Thomas William Allies (12 February 181317 June 1903) was an English historical writer specializing in religious subjects. He was one of the Anglican churchmen who joined the Roman Catholic Church in the early period of the Oxford Movement.

Life
Allies was born at Midsomer Norton in Somerset and briefly educated at Bristol Grammar School and then at Eton College, where he was the first winner of the Newcastle Scholarship in 1829, and at Wadham College, Oxford, of which he became a fellow in 1833.

In the later 1830s Allies became a Tractarian supporter, influenced by William Dodsworth. In 1840 Bishop Blomfield of London appointed him his examining chaplain and presented him to the rectory of Launton, Oxfordshire, which he resigned in 1850 on becoming a Roman Catholic. Allies was appointed secretary to the Catholic Poor School Committee in 1853, a position which he occupied till 1890. Allies raised £50,000 to assist Catholic schools with meeting the needs of education acts.

Allies was a strong influence on his family and after 1883 his daughter Mary was left at home. Inspired by her father she devoted her time to writing about the lives of Catholic saints. He died in London in 1903 and he was buried beside his wife who had died the year before.

Works

His major work was The Formation of Christendom (London, 8 vols., 1865-1895). His other writings included  (1852);  (1850); Per Crucem ad Lucem (2 vols., 1879). They went through many editions and were translated into several languages.

References 
 His autobiography,  (1880); 
 The study by his daughter, Mary H. Allies, Thomas Allies, the Story of a Mind (London, 1906), which contains a full bibliography of his works.
 C.D.A. Leighton,  "Thomas Allies, John Henry Newman and Providentialist History." History of European Ideas 38.2 (2012): 248-265.

Notes

External links 
 
 

1813 births
1903 deaths
19th-century English historians
Christian writers
Alumni of Wadham College, Oxford
Anglican priest converts to Roman Catholicism
English Roman Catholics
People educated at Bristol Grammar School
People educated at Eton College
People from Midsomer Norton
19th-century English Anglican priests